Things That Fall from the Sky is a collection of eleven short stories by American author Kevin Brockmeier.

"These Hands" was selected for Prize Stories 2000: The O. Henry Awards, "The Ceiling" appeared in The O. Henry Prize Stories 2002 (First Prize), and "Space" appeared in The Best American Short Stories 2003.

Stories
 These Hands (first appeared in The Georgia Review)
 Things That Fall from the Sky (first appeared in Crazyhorse)
 Apples (first appeared in The Chicago Tribune)
 A Day in the Life of Half of Rumpelstiltskin (first appeared in Writing on the Edge)
 The Ceiling (first appeared in McSweeney's)
 Small Degrees
 The Jesus Stories
 Space (first appeared in The Georgia Review)
 The Passenger
 The Light through the Window
 The House at the End of the World

External links
Review at The New Yorker

American short story collections
2002 short story collections
Pantheon Books books